Patrikeyev or Patrikeev is a Russian masculine surname, its feminine counterpart is Patrikeyeva or Patrikeeva. It may refer to
Nadezhda Andreyeva (née Patrikeyeva; 1959–2014), Russian alpine skier
Vassian Patrikeyev, 16th century Russian ecclesiastic and political figure 
Yury Patrikeyev (born 1979), Armenian-Russian wrestler

Russian-language surnames